Te Llevo en Mi is the debut studio album by American Tejano music singer Jay Perez. The album peaked at number ten on the US Billboard Regional Mexican Albums chart. It garnered Perez the Billboard Latin Music Awards for New Regional Mexican Artist in 1994, as well as a nomination for the Tejano Music Award for Male Entertainer of the Year at the 1994 Tejano Music Awards. His English-language effort "On This Side of the Door" was nominated for the Tejano Country Single of the Year.

Track listing 
Credits adapted from the liner notes of Te Llevo en Mi.

Chart performance

Weekly charts

Year-end charts

See also 

 1993 in Latin music
 Latin American music in the United States

References

Works cited 

1993 debut albums
Sony Discos albums
Spanish-language albums
Jay Perez albums